Unique negative dimension (UND) is a complexity measure for the model of learning from positive examples.
The unique negative dimension of a class  of concepts is the size of the maximum subclass  such that for every concept , we have  is nonempty.

This concept was originally proposed by M. Gereb-Graus in "Complexity of learning from one-side examples", Technical Report TR-20-89, Harvard University Division of Engineering and Applied Science, 1989.

See also
 Computational learning theory

References

Computational learning theory